Anil Chaudhary is an Indian director, producer and screenwriter. He is the maker of notable television shows such as Mahayagya (1997), Phatichar (1991), Kabeer (1986) and Gunwale Dulhania Le Jayenge (2009). He is credited with writing television shows such as Karamchand, Nukkad and Rajani. He also authored and directed numerous theatre plays one of which is 'Chopra Kamaal Naukar Jamal' that was adapted from Bertolt Brecht's play 'Mr. Puntila and his man Matti'.

Personal life
Anil was born in 1950 in Dholpur, Rajasthan. After studying at Kishori Raman (P.G.) college in Mathura, Uttar Pradesh he moved to Delhi and attended the National School of Drama where he obtained a diploma in direction.

Career

Films
Credited as the dialogue writer
Amar Jyoti
Rao Saheb
Kabootar
Lanka

TV serials

Game shows
As writer
Sawaal Dus Crore Ka

Theatre plays
Chopra Kamaal Naukar Jamal
Uddhwast Dharmashala
Andhere Mein
Nishachar
Rustam Sohrab
Nautanki – Laila Majnoo
Inna
Bakari
Kaua Chala Hans Ki Chaal

References

1950 births
Living people
Indian film directors
Indian film producers
Indian male screenwriters